Klanec pri Komnu is a small village west of Komen in the Littoral region of Slovenia close to the border with Italy.

Name
The name of the settlement was changed from Klanec to Klanec pri Komnu in 1953.

Cultural heritage

There is a stone monument in the center of the village commemorating Hungarian soldiers killed in the First World War. The monument stands on a stepped plinth; it consists of a cube engraved with the Hungarian coat of arms and the years 1915–1916 topped by an obelisk. It is surrounded by small pillars, of which two are preserved originals.

References

External links

Klanec pri Komnu on Geopedia

Populated places in the Municipality of Komen